Freemake Audio Converter is an ad-supported audio conversion utility developed by Ellora Assets Corporation. The program is used to convert across different audio formats, merge audio files, and extract audio from video files. Freemake Audio Converter 1.0.0 does not support CD burning. Since 2016, the program has reached a user base of over 63 million people.

License
Freemake Audio Converter may be downloaded free of charge but prevents users to convert files which are longer than 3 minutes, unless its commercial version is purchased. It may offer to download and install other products from its advertisement partners.

Features 
Freemake Audio Converter accepts over 40 audio file formats such as MP3, WMA, WAV, FLAC, AAC, M4A, OGG, AMR, AC3, AIFF, and M4R. It can convert audio to MP3, WMA, WAV, FLAC, AAC, M4A, and OGG, and can prepare files for playback on various portable media players, such as Zune, Coby, SanDisc, Sansa, iRiver, Walkman, Archos, and GoGear. It can convert audio files into M4A and M4R files for iPad, iPhone, and iPod and automatically adds converted files to the iTunes library.

Freemake Audio Converter features a batch audio conversion mode to convert multiple audio files simultaneously. The program can also combine multiple audio files into a single file. The software includes several ready-made presets for each supported output file format and the ability to create a custom preset with the adjustment of bitrate, audio channels, and sample rate.

The program is capable of extracting the audio soundtrack from different video formats, such as DVD, MP4, AVI, MPEG, H.264, MKV, DIVX, MOV, WMV, VOB, 3GP, RM, QT, and FLV.

The user interface of Freemake Audio Converter is based on Windows Presentation Foundation technology.

See also 
 Comparison of audio formats
 Freemake Music Box
 Freemake Video Converter
 Freemake Video Downloader
 List of free software for audio
 List of music software

References

External links 
 
 Official download

2011 software
Audio software
Windows-only shareware
Adware
File conversion software